Sylamore is an unincorporated community in Izard County, Arkansas, United States.

References

Unincorporated communities in Izard County, Arkansas
Unincorporated communities in Arkansas